The UK Albums Chart is one of many music charts compiled by the Official Charts Company that calculates the best-selling albums of the week in the United Kingdom. Since 2004 the chart has been based on the sales of both physical albums and digital downloads. This list shows albums that peaked in the Top 10 of the UK Albums Chart during 2016, as well as albums which peaked in 2015 but were in the top 10 in 2016. The entry date is when the album appeared in the top 10 for the first time (week ending, as published by the Official Charts Company, which is six days after the chart is announced).

One-hundred and sixty-seven albums were in the top 10 this year. Two albums from 2014 and eight albums from 2015 remained in the top 10 for several weeks at the beginning of the year. A Head Full of Dreams by Coldplay was the only album from 2015 to reach its peak in 2016. Giggs and Jack Garratt were among the many artists who achieved their first UK charting top 10 album in 2016.

The 2015 Christmas number-one album, 25 by Adele, remained at number one for the first two weeks of 2016. The first new number-one album of the year was Blackstar by David Bowie. Overall, thirty-five different albums peaked at number-one in 2016, with David Bowie (2) having the most albums hit that position.

Background

Chart debuts
The following table (collapsed on desktop site) does not include acts who had previously charted as part of a group and secured their first top 10 solo album, or featured appearances on compilations or other artists recordings.

Soundtracks
The only film soundtrack album to enter the top 10 this year was Purple Rain by Prince and The Revolution. The album had previously charted in the top 10 upon its initial release in 1984 and peaked at number 7. Upon its 2016 re-entry, following Prince's death, the album reached a brand new peak of number 4.

Best-selling albums
For the second year in a row, Adele had the best-selling album of the year with 25. A Head Full of Dreams by Coldplay came in second place. Michael Ball & Alfie Boe's Together, Purpose from Justin Bieber and The Wonder of You by Elvis Presley with the Royal Philharmonic Orchestra made up the top five. Albums by David Bowie, Little Mix, Drake, Jess Glynne and David Bowie (Best of Bowie) were also in the top ten best-selling albums of the year.

Top-ten albums
Key

Entries by artist
The following table shows artists who achieved two or more top 10 entries in 2016, including albums that reached their peak in 2015. The figures only include main artists, with featured artists and appearances on compilation albums not counted individually for each artist. The total number of weeks an artist spent in the top ten in 2016 is also shown.

Notes

 Nothing Has Changed: The Best of David Bowie originally peaked at number 9 upon its initial release in 2014. It re-entered the top 10 at its brand new peak of number 5 on 21 January 2016 (week ending) following the death of David Bowie.
 Best of Bowie originally peaked outside the top-ten at number 11 upon its initial release in 2002. It made the top 10 for the first time in January 2016, following David Bowie's death, entering on 28 January (week ending) at number 3 and rising to number-one two weeks later.
 Hunky Dory first entered the UK Albums Chart in 1972 and made the top 10 for the first time in 1973, peaking at number 3. Following David Bowie's death, the album re-entered the top 10 at number 9 on 4 February 2016 (week ending).
 The Rise and Fall of Ziggy Stardust and the Spiders from Mars first entered the top 10 in 1972 and rose to its peak of number 5 in 1973. Following David Bowie's death, the album re-entered the top 10 at number 10 on 4 February 2016 (week ending).
 Ultimate Prince originally peaked at number 24 upon its initial release in 2006. It made the top 10 for the first time in 2007, peaking at number 6. Following Prince's death, the album re-entered the top 10 and reached a brand new peak of number 3.
 The Very Best of Prince originally peaked at number 2 upon its initial release in 2001. Following Prince's death, the album re-entered the top 10 at number 2, the second time the album had made the runner-up spot.
 Purple Rain originally peaked at number 7 upon its initial release in 1984. Following Prince's death, the album re-entered the top 10 and reached a brand new peak of number 4.
 All Over the World: The Very Best of Electric Light Orchestra originally peaked at number 6 upon its initial release in 2005. It re-entered the top 10 in both 2011 and 2012 and would ultimately reach its peak of number-one in 2016 following Electric Light Orchestra's performance at that year's Glastonbury festival.
 21 originally peaked at number-one upon its initial release in 2011.
 Legend originally peaked at number-one upon its initial release in 1984. It re-entered the top 10 in 2014, this time reaching number 7.
 Greatest Hits originally peaked at number-one upon its initial release in 2004. It re-entered the top 10 in 2006, this time reaching number 5.
 Figure includes album that peaked in 2015.

See also
2016 in British music
List of number-one albums from the 2010s (UK)

References
General

Specific

External links
2016 album chart archive at the Official Charts Company (click on relevant week)

United Kingdom top 10 albums
Top 10 albums
2016